Empire Union School District is a school district based in Modesto, California, United States.

Its schools are located in the California communities of Modesto and Empire in Stanislaus County and include:
 = active
 Capistrano Elementary School
 Empire Elementary School
 Norman Glick Middle School
 Bernard Hughes Elementary School
 Christine Sipherd Elementary School
 Alice N. Stroud Elementary School
Teel Middle School (shut down)

References

External links

School districts in Stanislaus County, California
Education in Modesto, California